A constitutional referendum was held in Andorra on 14 March 1993. Drafted by the Co-Princes and the General Council, the new constitution was approved by 74.2% of voters, with a 76% turnout. The first elections under the new constitution were held later in the year.

Results

References

1993 referendums
1993 in Andorra
Referendums in Andorra
Constitutional referendums
March 1993 events in Europe